Michael Jeffrey Larsen is an American mathematician, a distinguished professor of mathematics at Indiana University Bloomington.

Academic biography
In high school, Larsen tied with four other competitors for the top score in the 1977 International Mathematical Olympiad in Belgrade, winning a gold medal. As an undergraduate mathematics student at Harvard University, Larsen became a Putnam Fellow in 1981 and 1983. He graduated from Harvard in 1984, and earned his Ph.D. from Princeton University in 1988, under the supervision of Gerd Faltings. After working at the Institute for Advanced Study he joined the faculty of the University of Pennsylvania in 1990, and then moved to the University of Missouri in 1997. He joined the Indiana University faculty in 2001.

His wife Ayelet Lindenstrauss is also a mathematician and Indiana University professor. Their son Daniel at age 13 became the youngest person to publish a crossword in the New York Times.

Research
Larsen is known for his research in arithmetic algebraic geometry, combinatorial group theory, combinatorics, and number theory. He has written highly cited papers on domino tiling of Aztec diamonds, topological quantum computing, and on the representation theory of braid groups.

Awards and honors
In 2013 he became a fellow of the American Mathematical Society, for "contributions to group theory, number theory, topology, and algebraic geometry".
He received the E. H. Moore Research Article Prize of the AMS in 2013 (jointly with Richard Pink).

Selected publications
.
.
.
.

References

External links
Home page at Indiana University

Year of birth missing (living people)
Living people
20th-century American mathematicians
21st-century American mathematicians
Putnam Fellows
Harvard University alumni
Princeton University alumni
University of Pennsylvania faculty
University of Missouri faculty
Indiana University faculty
Fellows of the American Mathematical Society
International Mathematical Olympiad participants